The second Zaia government, led by president Luca Zaia, was the government of Veneto from 29 June 2015 to 16 October 2020.

Governments of Veneto
2015 establishments in Italy